Nancy Tyson Burbidge  (5 August 1912 – 4 March 1977) was an Australian systemic botanist, conservationist and herbarium curator.

Early life and training
Burbidge was born in Cleckheaton, Yorkshire; her father, William Burbidge, was an Anglican clergyman and immigrated to Australia in 1913 when he was appointed to a parish in Western Australia. She was educated at Katanning (Kobeelya) Church of England Girls' School – founded by her mother Nancy Eleanor. She completed her schooling in 1922 when she graduated from Bunbury Senior High School, and went on to study at the University of Western Australia. She completed her BSc in 1937, and afterwards received a prize to travel to England, where she spent 18 months at the Royal Botanic Gardens Kew. While at Kew she worked on a revision of the Australian grass genus Enneapogon. When Nancy returned to Australia she continued her study of Australian plants through the University of Western Australia, completing her MSc. in 1945.

Career
In 1943 Burbidge was appointed assistant agronomist at the Waite Agricultural Research Institute in Adelaide, where she started working on native pasture species for arid and semi-arid South Australia. She was appointed to the new position of systematic botanist at the CSIRO Division of Plant Industry, Canberra in 1946. At CSIRO she worked on organising and extending the herbarium, first as a research scientist and then as curator and was responsible for laying the foundations of the Herbarium Australiense, later the National Australian Herbarium. She wrote Key to the South Australian species of Eucalyptus L'Hér.  but had not specialised on the genus. Her professional interest in systemic botany was reflected by her tenure as secretary of the systematic botany committee of the Australian and New Zealand Association for the Advancement of Science from 1948 to 1952. She also edited Australasian Herbarium News until her until 1953, when she took a years leave to be the Australian Botanical Liaison Officer at the Kew Gardens herbarium. While at Kew she photographed and indexed type specimens of Australian plants and made microfilm copies of Robert Brown's notebooks for Australian herbaria.

When she returned to Australia in 1954 she began a very productive period of her career. She wrote an extensive paper "The phytogeography of the Australian region" which was published in the Australian Journal of Botany in 1960 and contributed to the award of her DSc by the University of Western Australia in 1961. Her Dictionary of Australian Plant Genera was published in 1963, and she completed studies of the plant groups Nicotiana, Sesbania and Helichrysum. Many of her publications included her own drawings. After resigning her position as curator of the herbarium she went on to be heavily involved in the development of the Flora of Australia series, directing the project from 1973 to 1977. In addition to her books, she also wrote over 50 papers on phytogeography, ecology, botanical history and Australian plant genera. For her contributions to botany she was awarded the 1971 Clarke Medal for her achievements in taxonomic botany and ecology by the Royal Society of New South Wales and made a member of the Order of Australia in 1976.

Burbidge was also interested in conservation. She was a founding member of the National Parks Association of the Australian Capital Territory in 1960, and twice served as its president. She was prominent in the lobbying for the establishment of national parks in the ACT including Tidbinbilla Nature Reserve and Namadgi National Park; both of which were established following her death. She was also a member of the Australian Federation of University Women, serving as president of the Canberra branch from 1959 to 1961, of the Pan-Pacific and South East Asia Women's Association from 1957 to 1958 and as international secretary between 1961 and 1968.

Recognition

For her contributions to botany Burbidge was awarded the 1971 Clarke Medal for her achievements in taxonomic botany and ecology by the Royal Society of New South Wales and made a member of the Order of Australia in 1976.

Burbidge's contributions are commemorated by an altar-frontal, showing banksias and honey-eaters, in St Michael's Anglican Church, Mount Pleasant, Western Australia, and by the Nancy T. Burbidge Memorial, an amphitheatre in the Australian National Botanic Gardens in Canberra. The Australian Plant Name Index is dedicated to her memory and a peak in Namadgi is named Mount Burbidge in her honour. Acacia burbidgeae also known as Burbidge's wattle is also named in her honour.

The 'Nancy T. Burbidge medal' is presented annually by the Australian Systematic Botanists Society for outstanding contribution to taxonomic and systematic botanical work in Australia.

The Australian National Herbarium holds over 7000 specimens collected by Burbidge. Other herbaria in Australia holding her collections include Western Australian Herbarium, National Herbarium of New South Wales, Tasmanian Herbarium, State Herbarium of South Australia, Queensland Herbarium, Northern Territory Herbarium.

Standard author abbreviation

Publications

The Wattles of the Australian Capital Territory (1961)
Dictionary of Australian Plant Genera: Gymnosperms and Angiosperms (1963) 
Australian Grasses, 2 volumes (1966–1970) 
Flora of the Australian Capital Territory with Max Gray (1970) 
Plant Taxonomic Literature in Australian Libraries (1978)

References

External links

Nancy T Burbidge Memorial Amphitheatre, Australian National Botanic Gardens
Australian Plant name Index
Photograph of Nancy Burbidge (seated on right) from the National Archives of Australia.

1912 births
1977 deaths
20th-century Australian botanists
Women botanists
Members of the Order of Australia
Australian Botanical Liaison Officers
Australian conservationists
Scientists from Western Australia
People from Cleckheaton
English emigrants to Australia
Australian women scientists
20th-century British women scientists
20th-century Australian women
University of Western Australia alumni